BBC Radio Manchester is the BBC's local radio station serving Greater Manchester.

It broadcasts on FM, DAB, digital TV and via BBC Sounds from studios at MediaCityUK in Salford Quays.

According to RAJAR, the station has a weekly audience of 194,000 listeners and a 3.3% share as of December 2022.

History

BBC Radio Manchester (1970–1988) 

BBC Radio Manchester launched at 6am on 10 September 1970 as the first local radio station in the city of Manchester. Initially broadcasting from studios at 33 Piccadilly overlooking Piccadilly Gardens in the city centre, the station's long-standing home was New Broadcasting House on Oxford Road. Radio Manchester originally broadcast only on 95.1 VHF (FM); the frequency of 206 metres (1457 kHz), on the AM / medium wave band was added approximately 2 years after the station first went on air. The first voice on air was Alan Sykes. Other presenters included Roy Cross, Sandra Chalmers, Mike Riddoch and Alex Greenhalgh. 

In the mid 1970s, Radio Manchester was notable for the "Midway through the Day" programme which introduced strip programming and ran from lunchtime until 7pm. Presenters changed throughout the day and it was the precursor of the now common chat and music format. At the same time Radio Manchester began an evening programme from 10 to midnight which often repeated interviews from  "Midway through the Day". By the 1980s the late evening programming had ended, apart from on Sundays when local programming continued to be broadcast until midnight.

Opt-out stations 
In 1983 and 1984 the radio station ran a series of experimental community stations jointly funded by the BBC and the Greater Manchester County Council, each of which used the 1296 kHz AM frequency in turn. The stations were BBC Radio Bury (late 1983/early 1984), BBC Radio Oldham, BBC Radio Rochdale (eight weeks from 14 May 1984), BBC Radio Trafford (which operated from a mobile studio in a school playground) and BBC Radio Wigan  (summer 1984). The stations were part-time services which opted out from the main BBC Radio Manchester service. The experiments were never repeated.

BBC GMR (1988–2006) 
From October 1988 until 3 April 2006, the station was named BBC GMR (Greater Manchester Radio) and, for a brief period in 1997, GMR Talk. Programmes included a phone-in with Allan Beswick (who remains at the station and has presented a variety of shows at differing times, currently presenting a late night talk show which is now only broadcast at weekends and simulcast with BBC Radio Lancashire and BBC Radio Merseyside), late-night music and comedy show Michelle Mullane around Midnight and GMR Brass, a brass band music programme. From 1991, GMR was part of the BBC Night Network.

In 1996, BBC GMR began broadcasting from a second transmitter from Saddleworth on 104.6 FM, (which had and continues to serve as a transmitter for Key 103 for over 20 years). This meant areas of the Upper Tame Valley including Saddleworth and Tameside, down to Hyde saw improved coverage, which was poor at times from Holme Moss especially indoors.

BBC Radio Manchester relaunch (2006–present) 

After 18 years the station reverted to its original name, Radio Manchester along with a new jingle package composed by IQ Beats. The first voice on the relaunched station was that of Tony Wilson followed by long-time local personality and breakfast presenter Terry Christian, the first song was Manchester by the Beautiful South.

At 6am on Saturday 8 October 2011, the station ended its transmissions from its Oxford Road studios and began broadcasting from MediaCityUK in Salford Quays. The final show from Oxford Road was presented by Darryl Morris and the first from the new studios by Andy Crane.

Programming
Local programming is produced and broadcast from the BBC's Salford studios from 6am - 1am on Saturday - Fridays.

The Allan Beswick phone-in, airing from 10pm - 1am on Saturday and Sunday nights, is simulcast with BBC Radio Lancashire and BBC Radio Merseyside.

During the station's downtime, BBC Radio Manchester simulcasts overnight programming from BBC Radio 5 Live and BBC Radio London.

Presenters

Notable current presenters include:

Allan Beswick (Saturday - Sunday nights)
Stacey Copeland (Wednesday - Friday late-nights & Sunday afternoons, cover)
Mark Crossley (Breakfast sport)
Jsky (Dead Good Show.   Wednesday 7pm-10pm)
Natalie Pike (Talking Balls)
Mike Sweeney (Monday - Thursday daytime)
Phil Trow (Monday - Tuesday late-nights)
Becky Want (Monday - Thursday Drivetime)

Notable former presenters 

Gordon Burns
Sandra Chalmers
Terry Christian
Jeff Cooper
Andy Crane
Victoria Derbyshire
Stephanie Hirst
Susie Mathis
Darryl Morris
Dianne Oxberry
Mike Shaft
Petroc Trelawny
Tony Wilson

See also
Manchester Sports
Eastern Horizon
Timeline of radio in Manchester

References

External links 
 
 BBC Radio Manchester marks 40 years on the air

Radio stations established in 1970
Manchester
Radio stations in Manchester
1970 establishments in England